Garrett Bartholomew Temple (born May 8, 1986) is an American professional basketball player for the New Orleans Pelicans of the National Basketball Association (NBA). He played college basketball for the LSU Tigers from 2005 until 2009. An NBA journeyman, Temple went undrafted in 2009 and has played for 11 NBA teams.

High school career
Temple attended LSU Laboratory School in Baton Rouge, Louisiana. As a senior, he averaged 13.9 points, 7.4 rebounds and 5.5 assists in leading University High to the 2004 Class 2A state championship.

At University High, Temple also competed in track and field, where he was a long jump and triple jump specialist.

College career
After redshirting the 2004–05 season at Louisiana State University to work on his game, Temple earned a reputation as a defensive stopper as a freshman in 2005–06. In 36 games (35 starts), he averaged 5.1 points, 2.6 rebounds, 2.8 assists and 1.1 steals in 33.3 minutes per game.

In his sophomore season, he finished the year with 138 assists and 83 turnovers, a 1.7 assist/turnover ratio, which was 10th best in the SEC. In May 2007, he was part of the Reach USA Tour of China, an all-star team of players that went 6-2 against two Chinese league teams. In 32 games (all starts), he averaged 8.6 points, 3.7 rebounds, 4.3 assists and 1.6 steals per game.

In his junior season, he played a team high 1,066 minutes and ranked 11th in the league in assist average. In 31 games, he averaged 6.4 points, 4.2 rebounds, 3.6 assists and 1.3 steals per game.

In his senior season, he became LSU's all-time leader in minutes played (4,432), breaking a record set by Howard Carter in 1983. He earned All-SEC Defensive team honors, as well as being named to the coaches' All-SEC second team. In 35 games, he averaged 7.1 points, 4.5 rebounds, 3.8 assists and 1.7 steals per game.

Professional career

Rio Grande Valley Vipers (2009–2010) 
After going undrafted in the 2009 NBA draft, Temple joined the Houston Rockets for the 2009 NBA Summer League. In September 2009, he signed with the Rockets. However, he was later waived by the Rockets on October 21, 2009. In November 2009, he was acquired by the Rio Grande Valley Vipers as an affiliate player.

Houston Rockets (2010) 
On February 8, 2010, Temple signed a 10-day contract with the Rockets. On February 20, 2010, he signed a second 10-day contract with the Rockets.

Sacramento Kings (2010) 
On March 3, 2010, Temple signed a 10-day contract with the Sacramento Kings.

San Antonio Spurs (2010) 
On March 13, 2010, Temple signed a 10-day contract with the San Antonio Spurs. On March 23, 2010, he signed with the Spurs for the rest of the season.

In July 2010, Temple joined the San Antonio Spurs for the 2010 NBA Summer League. On November 11, 2010, he was waived by the Spurs.

Return to the Vipers (2010) 
On November 30, 2010, Temple was re-acquired by the Rio Grande Valley Vipers.

Erie BayHawks (2010–2011) 
On December 30, 2010, Temple was traded to the Erie BayHawks in exchange for Jeff Adrien.

Milwaukee Bucks (2011) 
On January 25, 2011, Temple signed a 10-day contract with the Milwaukee Bucks. On February 5, 2011, he signed a second 10-day contract with the Bucks.

Return to the BayHawks (2011) 
On February 17, 2011, Temple returned to the BayHawks.

Charlotte Bobcats (2011) 
On March 7, 2011, Temple signed a 10-day contract with the Charlotte Bobcats. On March 17, 2011, he signed a second 10-day contract with the Bobcats. On March 28, 2011, he signed with the Bobcats for the rest of the season.

Casale Monferrato (2011–2012) 
On July 27, 2011, Temple signed a one-year deal with Novipiù Casale Monferrato of Italy. In 28 games, he averaged 9.5 points, 2.8 rebounds, 1.4 assists and 1.5 steals per game as Casale finished last on the ladder in 2011–12 with an 8-24 record.

Reno Bighorns (2012) 
In July 2012, Temple joined the Oklahoma City Thunder for the Orlando Summer League and the Cleveland Cavaliers for the Las Vegas Summer League.

On September 13, 2012, Temple signed with the Miami Heat. He was later waived by the Heat on October 27, 2012. On November 1, 2012, he was re-acquired by the Erie BayHawks. Four days later, he was traded to the Reno Bighorns.

Washington Wizards (2012–2016)
On December 25, 2012, Temple signed with the Washington Wizards.

On July 10, 2013, Temple re-signed with the Wizards. On July 18, 2014, he again re-signed with the Wizards to a two-year, $2 million deal. On November 1, 2014, he scored a then career-high 18 points in a 108–97 win over the Milwaukee Bucks.

On June 15, 2015, Temple exercised his player option with the Wizards for the 2015–16 season. On November 14, he matched his career-high of 18 points in a 108–99 win over the Orlando Magic. On December 19, he set a new career-high with 21 points in a 109–101 win over the Charlotte Hornets. On December 21, he topped that mark with 23 points in a 113–99 win over the Sacramento Kings. Two days later, he had another strong performance for the Wizards with 20 points against the Memphis Grizzlies, becoming the first NBA player to score at least 20 in three straight games after not reaching that level for his first 250 contests.

Sacramento Kings (2016–2018)
On July 9, 2016, Temple signed with the Sacramento Kings. He made his debut for the Kings in their season opener on October 26, 2016, scoring 12 points in just under 18 minutes off the bench in a 113–94 win over the Phoenix Suns. On November 5, 2016, he scored a team-high 19 points off the bench and tied his career high with five three-pointers in a 117–91 loss to the Milwaukee Bucks. On February 1, 2017, he was ruled out for two to three weeks after an MRI revealed a partial tear of his left biceps femoris muscle.

On January 23, 2018, Temple scored 19 of his career-high 34 points in the final quarter to lift the Kings to a 105–99 win over the Orlando Magic.

Memphis Grizzlies (2018–2019)
On July 17, 2018, Temple was traded to the Memphis Grizzlies in exchange for Deyonta Davis, Ben McLemore, a 2021 second-round pick and cash considerations. On October 19, 2018, he scored a game-high 30 points in a 131–117 win over the Atlanta Hawks. On January 26, 2019, he was ruled out for one to two weeks with a mild strain in his left shoulder.

Los Angeles Clippers (2019)
On February 7, 2019, Temple and JaMychal Green were traded to the Los Angeles Clippers in exchange for Avery Bradley.

Brooklyn Nets (2019–2020)
On July 8, 2019, Temple signed a reported two-year contract with the Brooklyn Nets.

Chicago Bulls (2020–2021)
On November 27, 2020, Temple signed with the Chicago Bulls.

New Orleans Pelicans (2021–present)
On August 8, 2021, Temple was traded to his hometown team, the New Orleans Pelicans.

NBA career statistics

Regular season

|-
| style="text-align:left;" rowspan=3|
| style="text-align:left;"|Houston
| 9 || 0 || 13.1 || .448 || .250 || .667 || 1.6 || .8 || .4 || .4 || 5.0
|-
| style="text-align:left;"|Sacramento
| 5 || 0 || 4.6 || .375 || .000 || 1.000 || .6 || .4 || .2 || .0 || 2.2
|-
| style="text-align:left;"|San Antonio
| 13 || 4 || 14.8 || .438 || .435 || .667 || 1.1 || .9 || .6 || .2 || 6.2
|-
| style="text-align:left;" rowspan=3|
| style="text-align:left;"|San Antonio
| 3 || 0 || 7.0 || .200 || .000 || .000 || .7 || .7 || .3 || .3 || .7
|-
| style="text-align:left;"|Milwaukee
| 9 || 0 || 9.2 || .333 || .300 || .000 || .7 || .7 || .1 || .1 || 1.9
|-
| style="text-align:left;"|Charlotte
| 12 || 0 || 10.5 || .286 || .269 || .636 || 1.3 || 2.0 || .8 || .3 || 3.2
|-
| style="text-align:left;"|
| style="text-align:left;"|Washington
| 51 || 36 || 22.7 || .407 || .325 || .703 || 2.4 || 2.3 || 1.0 || .3 || 5.1
|-
| style="text-align:left;"|
| style="text-align:left;"|Washington
| 75 || 0 || 8.5 || .362 || .207 || .698 || .9 || 1.0 || .5 || .1 || 1.8
|-
| style="text-align:left;"|
| style="text-align:left;"|Washington
| 52 || 18 || 14.1 || .400 || .375 || .729 || 1.7 || 1.1 || .8 || .2 || 3.9
|-
| style="text-align:left;"|
| style="text-align:left;"|Washington
| 80 || 43 || 24.4 || .398 || .345 || .728 || 2.7 || 1.8 || .9 || .2 || 7.3
|-
| style="text-align:left;"3|
| style="text-align:left;"|Sacramento
| 65 || 20 || 26.6 || .424 || .373 || .784 || 2.8 || 2.6 || 1.3 || .4 || 7.8
|-
| style="text-align:left;"|
| style="text-align:left;"|Sacramento
| 65 || 35 || 24.8 || .418 || .392 || .769 || 2.3 || 1.9 || .9 || .4 || 8.4
|-
| style="text-align:left;" rowspan=2|
| style="text-align:left;"|Memphis
| 49 || 49 || 31.2 || .429 || .352 || .750 || 3.1 || 1.4 || 1.0 || .5 || 9.4
|-
| style="text-align:left;"|L.A. Clippers
| 26 || 6 || 19.6 || .396 || .296 || .742 || 2.5 || 1.4 || 1.0 || .2 || 4.7
|-
| style="text-align:left;"|
| style="text-align:left;"|Brooklyn
| 62 || 35 || 27.9 || .378 || .329 || .805 || 3.5 || 2.5 || .8 || .5 || 10.3
|-
| style="text-align:left;"|
| style="text-align:left;"|Chicago
| 56 || 25 || 27.3 || .415 || .335 || .800 || 2.9 || 2.2 || .8 || .5 || 7.6
|-
| style="text-align:left;"|
| style="text-align:left;"|New Orleans
| 59 || 16 || 18.6 || .376 || .319 || .683 || 2.4 || 1.3 || .7 || .4 || 5.2
|- class="sortbottom"
| style="text-align:center;" colspan="2"|Career
| 691 || 288 || 21.4 || .402 || .344 || .740 || 2.3 || 1.7 || .8 || .3 || 6.4

Playoffs

|-
| style="text-align:left;"|2010
| style="text-align:left;"|San Antonio
| 6 || 0 || 2.5 || .333 || .333 || 1.000 || .3 || .3 || .2 || .0 || .7
|-
| style="text-align:left;"|2014
| style="text-align:left;"|Washington
| 10 || 0 || .9 || 1.000 || 1.000 || – || .0 || .0 || .0 || .0 || .5
|-
| style="text-align:left;"|2015
| style="text-align:left;"|Washington
| 4 || 0 || 6.5 || .167 || .000 || .625 || .8 || .3 || .5 || .0 || 1.8
|-
| style="text-align:left;"|2019
| style="text-align:left;"|L.A. Clippers
| 6 || 0 || 10.5 || .273 || .143 || .700 || 1.2 || .3 || .5 || .2 || 2.3
|-
| style="text-align:left;"|2020
| style="text-align:left;"|Brooklyn
| 4 || 4 || 34.3 || .347|| .250 || .833 || 2.8 || 2.0 || .8 || .3 || 12.0
|-
| style="text-align:left;"|2022
| style="text-align:left;"|New Orleans
| 1 || 0 || 2.0 || — || — || — || 1.0 || .0 || .0 || .0 || .0
|- class="sortbottom"
| style="text-align:center;" colspan="2"|Career
| 31 || 4 || 8.1 || .338 || .240 || .720 || .8 || .4 || .3 || .1 || 2.5

Personal life
Temple is the son of Collis Temple and Soundra Johnson Temple. Collis was the first African-American to play basketball at LSU (1971–1974). He has a younger sister, Colleen Noelle, and two older brothers, Collis III (who played at LSU, 1999–2003) and Elliott.

Temple is a Christian. He wears a wrist band that says "In Jesus Name I Play". In 2020, Temple married Miss USA 2017 winner Kára McCullough. Their son was born in August 2020.

Community involvement
Temple is a member of the "Starting Five", along with Malcolm Brogdon, Joe Harris, Justin Anderson, and Anthony Tolliver. Their goal was to raise $225,000 through Hoops2O, founded by Brogdon, to fund five wells in East Africa by the end of the 2018–19 season. By February 2020, the charity had funded the construction of ten wells in Tanzania and Kenya, bringing water to over 52,000 citizens.

References

External links

1986 births
Living people
21st-century African-American sportspeople
A.S. Junior Pallacanestro Casale players
African-American basketball players
American expatriate basketball people in Italy
American men's basketball players
Basketball players from Baton Rouge, Louisiana
Brooklyn Nets players
Charlotte Bobcats players
Chicago Bulls players
Erie BayHawks (2008–2017) players
Houston Rockets players
Los Angeles Clippers players
LSU Tigers basketball players
Memphis Grizzlies players
Milwaukee Bucks players
New Orleans Pelicans players
Reno Bighorns players
Rio Grande Valley Vipers players
Sacramento Kings players
San Antonio Spurs players
Shooting guards
Small forwards
Undrafted National Basketball Association players
Washington Wizards players
20th-century African-American people